Big Town Ideas is a 1921 American silent comedy film directed by Carl Harbaugh and starring Eileen Percy, Laura La Plante and James Parrott. It was produced and distributed by Fox Film.

Cast
 Eileen Percy as Fan Tilden
 Kenneth Gibson as Alan Dix
 James Parrott as Spick Sprague
 Lon Poff as 	Deputy
 Laura La Plante as 	Molly Dorn
 Leo Sulky as 	George Small
 Harry DeRoy as 	Bald-headed Man
 Lefty James as 	Warden
 Lawrence A. Bowes as 	Governor 
 Paul Kamp as Grocer's Boy
 Paul Cazeneuve as 	Show Manager
 Clarence Wilson as 	Chef 
 Jess Aldridge as 	Governor's Bodyguard

References

Bibliography
 Munden, Kenneth White. The American Film Institute Catalog of Motion Pictures Produced in the United States, Part 1. University of California Press, 1997.

External links
 

1920s American films
1921 films
1921 comedy films
1920s English-language films
American silent feature films
American comedy films
American black-and-white films
Fox Film films
Films directed by Carl Harbaugh